Jin-joo, also spelled Jin-ju, is a Korean feminine given name. The meaning differs based on the hanja used to write each syllable of the given name. There are 43 hanja with the reading "jin" and 56 hanja with the reading "joo" on the South Korean government's official list of hanja which may be registered for use in given names. For example, the name could be written with hanja meaning "pearl" ( or ).

People with this name include:
Hong Jin-joo (born 1983), South Korean female professional golfer
JinJoo Lee (born 1987), South Korean female guitarist
Park Jin-joo (born 1988), South Korean actress
Moon Jin-ju (born 1990s), South Korean female wrestler

See also
List of Korean given names

References

Korean feminine given names